Blue triggerfish is a common name for several fishes and may refer to:

Odonus niger
Pseudobalistes fuscus